Delaware City is a city in New Castle County, Delaware, United States. The population was 1,695 at the 2010 census. It is a small port town on the eastern terminus of the Chesapeake and Delaware Canal and is the location of the Forts Ferry Crossing to Fort Delaware on Pea Patch Island.

History
The Delaware City Historic District, Chelsea, Eastern Lock of the Chesapeake and Delaware Canal, Fairview, and Fort Delaware on Pea Patch Island are listed on the National Register of Historic Places.

Geography
Delaware City is located at  (39.5778901, –75.5888150).

Economy
Delaware City is close to the Delaware City Oil Refinery belonging to PBF Energy.

Infrastructure

Transportation

Delaware Route 9 serves as the main road through Delaware City, passing southeast–northwest through the city on 5th Street. South of Delaware City, DE 9 passes over the Chesapeake and Delaware Canal on the Reedy Point Bridge. North of Delaware City, DE 9 has an intersection with Delaware Route 72, which provides access to U.S. Route 13 and Delaware Route 1. DART First State provides bus service to Delaware City along Route 44, which heads north to Christiana Mall. Delaware City is at the east end of the Chesapeake and Delaware Canal, which provides boaters with access to the Delaware River to the east and the Chesapeake Bay to the west. The Forts Ferry Crossing is a passenger ferry that provides access from Delaware City to Fort Delaware on Pea Patch Island in the Delaware River and to Fort Mott in New Jersey.

Utilities
Delmarva Power, a subsidiary of Exelon, provides electricity and natural gas to Delaware City. The water system in Delaware City is owned by the city and operated under contract by Artesian Water Company, a subsidiary of Artesian Resources. Sewer service in Delaware City is provided by New Castle County. Trash collection is provided under contract by Waste Industries while recycling collection is provided by the city. Cable and internet in Delaware City is provided by Atlantic Broadband and Verizon. Telephone service is provided mostly by Verizon, with Cavalier Telephone also serving the city.

Entertainment and leisure

Delaware City's Fort DuPont State Park contains the home field of the Diamond State Base Ball Club, a vintage base ball team.  The Diamond State Base Ball Club typically plays 4-6 games there per year.  The Diamond State Base Ball Club also plays at least once per year at Fort Delaware on Pea Patch Island and also at nearby Port Penn, Delaware.  The Diamond State Base Ball Club is a non-profit amateur organization created for the purposes of providing physical fitness to its members, educating the public on the history of baseball and local history, and serving as a point of public pride.

Education
Delaware City is in the Colonial School District. It operates William Penn High School.

Demographics

As of the census of 2000, there were 1,453 people, 567 households, and 395 families residing in the city. The racial makeup of the city was 87.47% White, 10.32% African American, 0.41% Native American, 0.21% Asian, 0.69% from other races, and 0.89% from two or more races. Hispanic or Latino of any race were 1.24% of the population.

There were 567 households, out of which 31.6% had children under the age of 18 living with them, 46.0% were married couples living together, 16.0% had a female householder with no husband present, and 30.2% were non-families. 25.4% of all households were made up of individuals, and 8.8% had someone living alone who was 65 years of age or older.  The average household size was 2.55 and the average family size was 3.03.

In the city, the population was spread out, with 24.8% under the age of 18, 7.2% from 18 to 24, 28.7% from 25 to 44, 27.3% from 45 to 64, and 12.0% who were 65 years of age or older.  The median age was 38 years. For every 100 females, there were 101.5 males.  For every 100 females age 18 and over, there were 98.4 males.

The median income for a household in the city was $43,611, and the median income for a family was $50,294. Males had a median income of $40,192 versus $27,800 for females. The per capita income for the city was $21,992.  About 5.9% of families and 8.5% of the population were below the poverty line, including 11.7% of those under age 18 and 11.2% of those age 65 or over.

Notable people
 Lt. Gen. Eugene Reybold, U.S. Army Corps of Engineers, chief of engineers, during World War II
 John E. Rickards, first Lieutenant Governor of Montana and the second Governor of Montana

References

External links
 Official city website
 Tourism website

 
Cities in New Castle County, Delaware
Cities in Delaware
Delaware populated places on the Delaware River